The A523 is a road in Cheshire, Derbyshire, Greater Manchester, and Staffordshire, England running from a junction with the A52 north west of Ashbourne to the A6 in Hazel Grove, passing through Leek and Macclesfield and near Poynton.

In March 2023, the Poynton Relief Road opened, taking the A523 west of Poynton across the former Woodford Aerodrome.

References

Roads in England
Roads in Cheshire